Grace Fu Hai Yien  (born 1964) is a Singaporean accountant and politician who has been serving as Minister for Sustainability and the Environment since 2020. A member of the governing People's Action Party (PAP), she has been the Member of Parliament (MP) representing Yuhua SMC since 2011. She was the first female Cabinet minister to head a ministry in the country's history.

An accountant by profession, Fu had worked at Overseas Union Bank, Haw Par Group and PSA Corporation before entering politics. She made her political debut in the 2006 general election as part of the five-member PAP team contesting in Jurong GRC and won. She has contested in Yuhua SMC since the 2011 general election.

Early life and education
Fu was born on 29 March 1964 in Singapore. She was educated at Nanyang Girls' High School and Hwa Chong Junior College before graduating from the National University of Singapore in 1985 with a Bachelor of Accountancy with honours degree in 1985. She subsequently completed a Master of Business Administration degree at the NUS Business School in 1991.

Career
Fu began her career with the Overseas Union Bank as an auditor from 1985 to 1988. She then joined the Haw Par Group, where she worked in corporate planning, financial control and business development from 1991 to 1995.

In October 1995, Fu joined PSA Corporation as Assistant Director (Finance). She took on additional responsibility as Vice-President (Marketing), and assumed the position of Financial Controller in October 1998. She was promoted to Executive Vice-President (Finance) in January 1999. In April 2003, Fu was appointed CEO of Singapore Terminals. In 2004, she became CEO of PSA South East Asia and Japan, where she was responsible for the business performance of PSA's flagship terminals in Singapore, Thailand, Brunei, and Japan.

Fu has been a non-practising member of the Institute of Certified Public Accountants of Singapore since 1992.

Political career
Fu made her political debut in the 2006 general election as part of the five-member PAP team contesting in Jurong GRC and won. Fu was subsequently elected as the Member of Parliament (MP) representing the Yuhua division of Jurong GRC in June 2006. She was one of 24 new PAP candidates introduced ahead of the general election.

On 1 August 2006, Fu was appointed Minister of State for National Development.

On 1 April 2008, Fu was promoted to Senior Minister of State for National Development, and appointed Senior Minister of State for Education concurrently.

At the 2011 general election, Fu contested in the newly created Yuhua SMC and won with 66.9% of the vote. Following the election, Fu was appointed Senior Minister of State for Information, Communications and the Arts, and Senior Minister of State for the Environment and Water Resources concurrently.

In January 2012, Fu expressed concerns over the planned 36–37% income cuts for ministers, saying that if ministerial pay was further reduced in the future, it would "make it harder for anyone considering political office". Her comments contributed to the ongoing public debate over compensation and motivation of public officials, and were subject to criticism from netizens in Singapore. Others defended her remark as fair, supporting her position that loss of privacy and public scrutiny adds a large personal cost to public positions not found in the private sector.

On 31 July 2012, Fu was made full minister, becoming the second woman in Singapore's history, after Lim Hwee Hua, to become a full minister in the Cabinet. She served as Minister in the Prime Minister's Office, Second Minister for the Environment and Water Resources, and Second Minister for Foreign Affairs from 2012 to 2015. In 2015, she was appointed Minister for Culture, Community and Youth, becoming the first female minister in Singapore to head a ministry.

In 2018, Fu appeared in the seventh episode of the television series Eat Already? 4 to promote the ActiveSG programme launched by the Ministry of Culture, Community and Youth.

Following the 2020 general election, Fu became Organising Secretary of the PAP's Central Executive Committee (CEC), and an advisor of Yuhua SMC Grassroots Organisations.

Fu served as Leader of the House from 2015 to 2020, before being appointed Minister for Sustainability and the Environment in 2020. 

She has also been a member of the Global Leaders Group on Antimicrobial Resistance, co-chaired by Prime Minister of Bangladesh Sheikh Hasina, and Prime Minister of Barbados Mia Mottley, since 2020.

Personal life
Fu's father, James Fu, was a former leftist journalist who became press secretary to Prime Minister Lee Kuan Yew. Her mother was a nurse.

Fu is married to technopreneur Ivan Lee and they have three sons.

References

External links

 Grace Fu on Prime Minister's Office
 Grace Fu on Parliament of Singapore

1964 births
Living people
Culture ministers
Government ministers of Singapore
Hwa Chong Junior College alumni
Members of the Cabinet of Singapore
Members of the Parliament of Singapore
National University of Singapore alumni
People's Action Party politicians
Singaporean people of Hokkien descent
Women government ministers of Singapore
Honorary Dames Commander of the Order of St Michael and St George
Singaporean women in politics
Environment ministers of Singapore